David James Mattacks (born 13 March 1948) is an English rock and folk drummer.  Best known for his work with Fairport Convention, Mattacks has also worked both as a session musician and as a performing artist. Apart from playing the drums, he is also a versed keyboard player and occasionally played the bass guitar on studio recordings.

He began as a trainee piano-tuner before taking up the drums. He played with several jazz bands before joining the British folk rock band Fairport Convention in August 1969, with whom he worked on and off until 1997.
In 1998, he moved to Marblehead, Massachusetts, United States, where he is a sought-after studio musician, record producer, and member of the band Super Genius, while still touring regularly with various acts in the United Kingdom, Europe and Australia.

Fairport Convention

He replaced Martin Lamble, who had died on 12 May 1969 in a road accident on the M1 motorway, as the drummer for Fairport Convention. Mattacks left Fairport Convention in early 1972 to join The Albion Country Band. Meanwhile, he had also contributed to numerous studio recordings such as the Morris On project, Nick Drake's Bryter Layter, Steve Ashley's "Stroll On" sessions, Steeleye Span's debut album Hark! The Village Wait, John Martyn's Solid Air and Harvey Andrews' album Writer of Songs. He returned to Fairport Convention in order to help complete the 1973 album Rosie with a revamped line up of the band.

Mattacks also played on Nine (1974) but left halfway through the making of the follow-up Rising for the Moon, following an altercation with engineer Glyn Johns. Some of Mattacks' most notable participation in studio recordings in the late 1970s are the work on art rock studio albums by Brian Eno (Before and After Science) and 801's Listen Now, as well as several Ashley Hutchings-related folk rock projects (The Compleat Dancing Master, Son of Morris On etc.). He also established himself as a touring drummer for Richard Thompson, playing on several of Thompson's studio albums.

When Fairport Convention re-formed in 1985 after a six-year absence, Mattacks was recruited as drummer. He had already been playing with them again during annual reunions at the fledgling Cropredy Festival. Mattacks remained with Fairport until 1997. He has rejoined them on occasion, such as at Cropredy in 2019, to celebrate the 50th anniversary of the release of Liege & Lief.

Other collaborations

Has toured with
Grey DeLisle
Rosanne Cash

Has recorded with

Judith Durham
Michael Chapman
Mike Heron
The Incredible String Band
Elton John (Ice on Fire, Leather Jackets)
XTC
Paul McCartney (Tug of War, Pipes of Peace, Flowers in the Dirt, Run Devil Run) 
George Harrison (Somewhere in England, Gone Troppo)
Cat Stevens (Back to Earth)
Loudon Wainwright III
Mary Chapin Carpenter (A Place in the World, Time* Sex* Love*)
Brian Eno
Alison Moyet
Murray Head (Voices)
Martin Phillipps
Joan Armatrading (Joan Armatrading, The Shouting Stage)
Jimmy Page
The Proclaimers
Gary Brooker
Elkie Brooks (Pearls II)
Nick Drake
Mitch Winston
Liane Carroll
Sandy Denny
Super Genius
Four Piece Suit
Barbara Dickson
The Happy Kenneths
The Barron Knights
Beverley Craven (Beverley Craven)
Sebastian Santa Maria
Shelagh McDonald
Shirley Collins
Kajagoogoo
Spirogyra
Bill Nelson's Red Noise
Brooks Williams
Ayuo
Debra Cowan
Michael Wang
Elaine O'Rourke
The Dream Academy
Sally Oldfield (Easy)
Phil Manzanera
Steve Harley (Yes You Can)
Jon Shain
John Martyn
Camel
Chris de Burgh
Matthew Fisher
Mary Ann Redmond
Chris Spedding
The Bar-Steward Sons of Val Doonican
Peter Green (Little Dreamer)

Has toured and recorded with

Kate & Anna McGarrigle
Chris Rea
Ralph McTell
The Chills
Mickey Jupp
Everything but the Girl
Richard Thompson
Georgie Fame
Jethro Tull
Ashley Hutchings
The Albion Band
Steeleye Span
Feast of Fiddles
Jimmy Page (Death Wish II)
Judith Owen
Nick Heyward
Andy Fairweather Low (La Booga Rooga)

References

External links
 Dave Mattacks official website
 
 
 
 Dave Mattacks 2021 Career-Overview Interview with Innerviews

1948 births
Living people
English rock drummers
Jethro Tull (band) members
Fairport Convention members
British folk rock musicians
English session musicians
People from Edgware
People from Marblehead, Massachusetts
Bill Nelson's Red Noise members
The Albion Band members
The Bunch members